The Gros Cap Archaeological District is a set of three archaeological sites located in Moran Township, Michigan, USA, designated 20MK6, 20MK7 and 20MK111. It was listed on the National Register of Historic Places in 1982. The three sites cover  and include a village site and portions of the Gros Cap Cemetery.

History
The site is associated with the Odawa people, who settled in the area around West Moran Bay in the late 17th century. The Odawa village, located on the shore of the bay, had at one time 1500 people living in it, and was connected via a trail to the village to the east where St. Ignace is now located. A cemetery (now known as the Gros Cap Cemetery and still in use) was originally adjacent to the tribal village and was used as their burial ground. As more European settlers moved into the area, the Ottawa population decreased due to further emigration or intermarriage with the arriving settlers. However, the cemetery continued to be used by French, English and, eventually, American settlers.

References

Further reading

Geography of Mackinac County, Michigan
Archaeological sites on the National Register of Historic Places in Michigan
Historic districts on the National Register of Historic Places in Michigan
National Register of Historic Places in Mackinac County, Michigan